Woore is a civil parish in Shropshire, England.  It contains ten listed buildings that are recorded in the National Heritage List for England.  All the listed buildings are designated at Grade II, the lowest of the three grades, which is applied to "buildings of national importance and special interest".   The parish contains the villages of Woore, Bearstone, and Dorrington and smaller settlements, and is otherwise rural.  The listed buildings consist of houses and farmhouses, a church, a former baptismal font in the churchyard, a bridge, and a milepost.


Buildings

References

Citations

Sources

Lists of buildings and structures in Shropshire